Transport in Tampere consists of car, bus, light rail and commuter rail services linking the city centre of Tampere, Finland to surrounding residential areas and towns in Pirkanmaa region. The system is managed by the Tampere Regional Transport Authority (Finnish: Tampereen seudun joukkoliikenne), branded as Nysse.  The name originates from a local colloquialism nysse tulee (from nyt se tulee, "now it's coming"), with nysse jokingly used to refer to any public transport vehicle.

Fare zones are in use between areas, assigned letters A-F, each depending on distance from the downtown of Tampere.

Roads

Commuter rail

The Tampere commuter rail network currently consists of one line centered around Tampere Central Station.  Line  connects Toijala, Viiala, Lempäälä to Tampere, continuing onward to Tesoma and Nokia.
Most of the services on the route are segmented on the route Tampere−Nokia; only several services a day use the entire route from Toijala to Nokia.

The Helsinki commuter rail line  also has limited services to Pirkanmaa, having its northern terminus in Tampere.

Buses

The backbone of public transport in Tampere remains the bus network. It also operates in all other towns under Nysse operation, those being Kangasala (Fare zones B-F), Lempäälä (B-C), Nokia (B-D), Orivesi (E), Pirkkala (B-C), Valkeakoski (D), Vesilahti (D) and Ylöjärvi (B-F).

The busiest and most important bus lines are branded trunk lines (runkolinjat), some of which may operate with 7.5 minute intervals at peak times.

Light rail

Tampere is currently constructing a light rail network, with the first phase (city centre to Hervanta and TAYS) opened on 9 August 2021 and the second (city centre to Lentävänniemi) to open in 2024.

Škoda Transtech is supplying the Artic X34 rolling stock for Tampere light rail.

See also
 Public transport
 Public transport in Helsinki
 Urban sprawl

References

Public transport in Finland
Transport in Tampere